William Edward Cunningham (20 February 1930 – 31 August 2007) was a Northern Ireland international footballer and manager.

Born in County Antrim but raised in Scotland from a young age, he signed for St Mirren in 1950 and played there until 1954 when he left for Leicester City. He joined Dunfermline Athletic in 1960 and was a member of the Scottish Cup-winning team which beat Celtic 2–0 in 1961. After retiring from playing, he went into management with Dunfermline Athletic and Falkirk. He returned to manage St Mirren in 1972, but resigned in 1974 for personal reasons. Before leaving, he recommended Alex Ferguson as his successor.

He rejected an approach from the Scottish FA to become the Scotland national team manager in 1971.

He played 30 matches for Northern Ireland, and was a member of their 1958 FIFA World Cup team.

He died, aged 77, on 31 August 2007.

Honours 
Falkirk
 Stirlingshire Cup : 1969-70

References

External links 

1930 births
2007 deaths
1958 FIFA World Cup players
Ardrossan Winton Rovers F.C. players
Association football fullbacks
Association footballers from Northern Ireland
Dunfermline Athletic F.C. managers
Dunfermline Athletic F.C. players
Falkirk F.C. managers
Football managers from Northern Ireland
Leicester City F.C. players
Northern Ireland international footballers
Scottish Junior Football Association players
Scottish Football League players
Sportspeople from County Antrim
St Mirren F.C. managers
St Mirren F.C. players
Scottish Football League managers
English Football League players